Alexis Joseph Nihon Jr. (January 10, 1946 – February 24, 2013) was an Olympic wrestler for the Bahamas. Born in Montreal, Quebec, Canada, he competed at the 1968 Summer Olympics.  His brother Robert Nihon, who was also a wrestler also competed at the same Olympics.

References

1946 births
2013 deaths
Canadian emigrants to the Bahamas
Bahamian male sport wrestlers
Sportspeople from Montreal
Canadian people of Walloon descent
Olympic wrestlers of the Bahamas
Wrestlers at the 1968 Summer Olympics
Canadian male sport wrestlers